John Wellington Gwynne,  (March 30, 1814 – January 7, 1902) was a Canadian lawyer and Puisne Justice of the Supreme Court of Canada.

Born in Castleknock, Ireland, the son of William Gwynne and Eliza Nelson, he emigrated to Canada in 1832.

Gwynne was elected a bencher of the Law Society of Upper Canada in 1849 and appointed QC in 1850.

In 1874, he was appointed a puisne judge of the Ontario Court of Appeal. In 1879, he was appointed to the Supreme Court of Canada and he served until his death in 1902.

References 
 Supreme Court of Canada Biography
 

1814 births
1902 deaths
Irish emigrants to pre-Confederation Canada
Justices of the Supreme Court of Canada
People from Castleknock
Lawyers in Ontario
Judges in Ontario
Canadian King's Counsel